This is a list of chapters of the manga series  written by Kanata Konami. It was serialized in Kodansha's seinen manga magazine Weekly Morning from 2004 to 2015. The manga is about a kitten  and follows her little adventures.

Kodansha publish the first tankōbon on November 22, 2004 and have been doing so annually. The final 12th volume was published on June 23, 2015. Each volume contains several short stories, broken down into 18 chapters, each a few pages long.



Volume list

References

Chi's Sweet Home